= Galerias Pachuca =

Shopping Mall in Pachuca, Mexico

Coordinates: 20.0981935°N 98.7679245°W

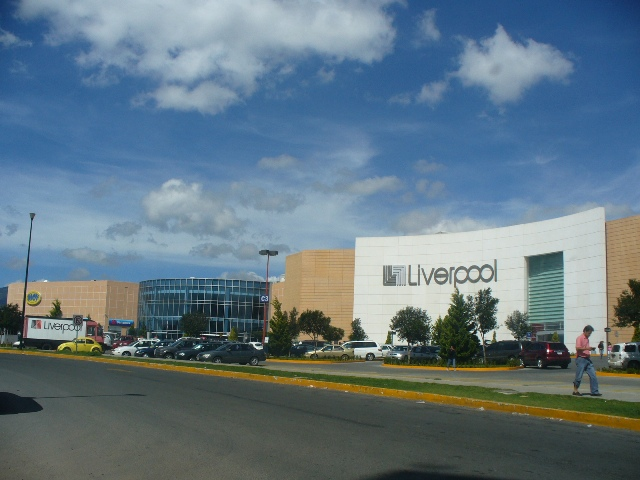
Plaza Galerias Pachuca

Plaza Galerias Pachuca is a two-story shopping mall in the city of Pachuca, capital of the state of Hidalgo, Mexico.
